The Friesian or Frisian, is an ancient Dutch breed of chicken. It originates in Friesland, on the North Sea coast of the northern Netherlands.

History 

The Friesian originated in Friesland in northern Holland, and is thought to be an ancient breed. It is apparently related to other breeds in the area such as the Assendelfts Hoen, the Drentse Hoen, the Groninger Meeuw, the Hollands Hoen, the Ostfriesische Möwe and the Westfälischer Totleger. The earliest written description may be that by R. Houwink in his Overzicht van alle bekende hoenderrassen, in hunne vormen en kleuren of 1909. From the early twentieth century the Friesian was supplanted as an egg-layer by more productive breeds such as the Barnevelder, the Leghorn, the Rhode Island Red and the Welsumer. During the First World War, it was not among the breeds for which a feed subsidy was available, and numbers fell. A breed society, the Fryske Hinne Klub, was formed in 1922. A monograph on the breed, Ús Fryske Hinnen by F. Hoogeveen, was published in 1947. A German breed society, the Sonderverein der Friesenhühner und Zwergfriesenhühner, was established in 1998.

Characteristics

There are both standard-sized and bantam Friesians. The standard fowl is a light breed: cocks weigh  and hens ; the bantam is very small.

The birds stand fairly upright, and hold their tails high. The eyes are large and dark orange; the earlobes are small, oval and white; the comb is single, red, rather small, and has five or six serrations; the beak is horn-coloured; the legs are white in the cuckoo-patterned variety, slate-blue in all others.

Twelve colour varieties are recognised in Holland, eleven in Germany, and three – chamois-pencilled, gold-pencilled and silver-pencilled – in the United Kingdom.

Use 

The hens are good layers of white eggs. They may give approximately 200 eggs per year, with an average weight of  Bantam hens lay about 120 eggs per year; the average weight is

References

Chicken breeds
Chicken breeds originating in the Netherlands
Culture of Friesland